Fan Chih-ku or Frank Fan is a Taiwanese politician. He was the Administrative Deputy Minister of the Ministry of Transportation and Communications of the Republic of China since 2013. He also serves as the Director-General of the Taiwan Railways Administration.

Education
Fan obtained his bachelor's degree in transportation management from National Cheng Kung University in 1978, master's degree in geotechnical and transportation engineering from Asian Institute of Technology in Thailand in 1985 and doctoral degree in transportation technology and management from National Chiao Tung University in 2004.

References

1954 births
Living people
Asian Institute of Technology alumni
National Cheng Kung University alumni
National Chiao Tung University alumni
Political office-holders in the Republic of China on Taiwan
Politicians of the Republic of China on Taiwan from Hsinchu County